The Pas-de-Calais ("strait of Calais"; ; also ) is a department in northern France named after the French designation of the Strait of Dover, which it borders. It has the most communes of all the departments of France, 890, and is the 8th most populous. It had a population of 1,465,278 in 2019. The Calais Passage connects to the Port of Calais on the English Channel. The Pas-de-Calais borders the departments of Nord and Somme and is connected to the English county of Kent via the Channel Tunnel.

History
Inhabited since prehistoric times, the Pas-de-Calais region was populated in turn by the Celtic Belgae, the Romans, the Germanic Franks and the Alemanni. During the fourth and fifth centuries, the Roman practice of co-opting Germanic tribes to provide military and defence services along the route from Boulogne-sur-Mer to Cologne created a Germanic-Romance linguistic border in the region that persisted until the eighth century.

Saxon colonization into the region from the fifth to the eighth centuries likely extended the linguistic border somewhat south and west so that by the ninth century most inhabitants north of the line between Béthune and Berck spoke a dialect of Middle Dutch, while the inhabitants to the south spoke Picard, a variety of Romance dialects.

This linguistic border is still evident today in the toponyms and patronyms of the region. Beginning in the ninth century, the linguistic border began a steady move to north and the east, and by the end of the 15th century Romance dialects had completely displaced those of Dutch.

Pas-de-Calais is one of the original 83 departments created during the French Revolution on 4 March 1790. It was created from parts of the former provinces of Calaisis, formerly English, Boulonnais, Ponthieu and Artois, this last formerly part of the Spanish Netherlands.

Some of the costliest battles of World War I were fought in the region. The Canadian National Vimy Memorial, eight kilometres from Arras, commemorates the Battle of Vimy Ridge assault during the Battle of Arras (1917) and is Canada's most important memorial in Europe to its fallen soldiers.

Pas-de-Calais was also the target of Operation Fortitude during World War II, which was an Allied plan to deceive the Germans that the invasion of Europe at D-Day was to occur here, rather than in Normandy.

Geography

Pas-de-Calais is in the current region of Hauts-de-France and is surrounded by the departments of Nord and Somme, the English Channel, and the North Sea. It shares a nominal border with the English county of Kent halfway through the Channel Tunnel.

The principal rivers are the following:

 Authie
 Canche
 Ternoise
 Liane
 Sensée
 Scarpe
 Deûle
 Lys
 Aa

Principal towns

Its principal towns are, on the coast, Calais and Boulogne-sur-Mer, and in Artois, Arras, Lens, Liévin, and Béthune. The most populous commune is Calais; the prefecture Arras is the second-most populous. As of 2019, there are 10 communes with more than 15,000 inhabitants:

Economy
The economy of the department was long dependent on mining, primarily the coal mines near the town of  Lens, Pas-de-Calais where coal was discovered in 1849. However, since World War II, the economy has become more diversified.

Demographics
The inhabitants of the department are called Pas-de-Calaisiens.

Pas-de-Calais is one of the most densely populated departments of France, but has no cities with over 100,000 residents: Calais has about 73,000 inhabitants. The remaining population is primarily concentrated along the border with the department of Nord in the mining district, where a string of small towns constitutes an urban area with a population of about 1.2 million. The centre and south of the department are more rural, but still quite heavily populated, with many villages and small towns.

Although the department saw some of the heaviest fighting of World War I, its population rebounded quickly after both world wars. However, many of the mining towns have seen dramatic decreases in population, some up to half of their population.

Population development since 1801:

Politics

Local elections 

The president of the Departmental Council is Jean-Claude Leroy, elected in 2017.

National politics 

In the second round of the French presidential elections of 2017 Pas-de-Calais was one of only two departments in which the candidate of the Front National, Marine Le Pen, received a majority of the votes cast: 52.06%.

Presidential elections 2nd round

Current National Assembly Representatives

Education

There are currently two public universities in the department. Although it is one of the most populous departments of France, Pas-de-Calais did not contain a university until 1991 when the French government created two universities: ULCO (Université du Littoral Côte d'Opale) on the western part of the department, and Université d'Artois on the eastern part.

Tourism

See also
 Cantons of the Pas-de-Calais department
 Communes of the Pas-de-Calais department
 Arrondissements of the Pas-de-Calais department
 Battle of Vimy Ridge
 7 Valleys Pas-de-Calais

References

External links

  A whole wiki about the Pas-de-Calais
  Prefecture website
  Departmental Council website
  Official Tourist website
  Short regional tourism guide
  Coats of arms of the municipalities in Pas-de-Calais

 
Departments of Hauts-de-France
1790 establishments in France
States and territories established in 1790